Niflhel ("Misty Hel"; Nifel meaning fog) is a location in Norse mythology which appears in the eddic poems Vafþrúðnismál and Baldrs draumar, and also in Snorri Sturluson's Gylfaginning. According to Snorri Sturluson's work, Niflhel could be interpreted as the lowest level of Hel, but Niflhel and sometimes Hel are conflated with the concept of Niflheim, a term which originates with Sturluson.

Prose Edda

Gylfaginning
In Gylfaginning by Snorri Sturluson, Gylfi, the old king of Scandinavia, receives an education in Norse mythology from Odin himself in the guise of three men. Gylfi learns from Odin (as Þriði) that Odin gave the first man his spirit, and that the spirits of just men will live forever in Gimlé, whereas those of evil men will live forever in Niflhel:

Poetic Edda

Vafþrúðnismál
In Vafþrúðnismál, Odin has wagered his head in a contest of wits with the giant (jotun) Vafþrúðnir. Odin asks Vafþrúðnir whether he can tell all the secrets of the gods and giants, and Vafþrúðnir answers that he can do so since he has been to all the nine worlds, including Niflhel:

Baldrs draumar
Though not a part of the Codex Regius, in the poem Baldrs draumar, Odin makes a visit to Niflhel himself in order to enquire about the bad dreams of his son Baldr:

References

Locations in Norse mythology
Afterlife places
Norse underworld